The Alabama shiner (Cyprinella callistia) is a species of fish in the family Cyprinidae. It is endemic to the United States where it occurs in the Alabama and Tombigbee river systems in Alabama, Georgia, eastern Mississippi, and extreme southeastern Tennessee.

Ecology
This species can be found in gravel and bedrock bottomed pools and runs of small creeks and rivers. Juveniles typically inhabit quieter, slow paced waters.

Characteristics
The Alabama shiner reaches a maximum of 13 cm and eats aquatic insects such as midge and blackfly larvae. Its physical characteristics include a bright orange/ yellow tail and a black spot on the base of the tail. They have the largest breeding tubercles of the genus Cyprinella. They also have horny projections on their head and body that aid in spawning. They are observed spawning in crevices between rocks. The mouth on the bottom of the head suggests bottom feeding. This species has diamond shaped scales and a compressed body.

References

https://web.archive.org/web/20130111034246/http://www.bio.utk.edu/hulseylab/Fishlist.html

External links
FishBase: "Cyprinella callistia Jordan, 1877"

Cyprinella
Fish described in 1877
Taxa named by David Starr Jordan